Adán Pérez Cavero (born 24 October 1989) is a Spanish footballer who plays as a midfielder for CD Teruel.

Club career
Born in Quinto, Zaragoza, Pérez made his senior debuts with CD Universidad de Zaragoza in the regional leagues, on loan from Andorra CF. He moved to Tercera División side SD Almazán in 2009, and continued to appear in the fourth level in the following years, representing CD Numancia B and Andorra.

On 28 June 2013 Pérez joined Real Zaragoza, being assigned to the reserves in the same division. He scored 23 goals during the campaign, also netting a brace in the play-offs' 3–1 win against CF Trival Valderas, and thus taking the Aragonese back to Segunda División B.

On 14 July 2014 Pérez signed a new two-year deal with the Blanquillos, being definitely promoted to the main squad in Segunda División. He played his first match as a professional on 23 August, starting in a 0–0 away draw against Recreativo de Huelva.

On 1 September 2014 Pérez moved to fellow league team Racing de Santander, in a season-long loan deal. On 7 August of the following year, after appearing rarely, he moved to CD Ebro in Segunda División B also in a temporary deal; upon returning, he rescinded his contract.

References

External links

1989 births
Living people
Sportspeople from the Province of Zaragoza
Spanish footballers
Footballers from Aragon
Association football midfielders
Segunda División players
Tercera División players
CD Universidad de Zaragoza players
CD Numancia B players
Real Zaragoza B players
Real Zaragoza players
Racing de Santander players
CD Ebro players
CDA Navalcarnero players
CD Tudelano footballers
CD Teruel footballers